Joseph James Connors (born February 5, 1945 in New York City) is an American art historian and educator, who specializes in the Italian Renaissance and Baroque architecture.

Career
Born in New York City, Connors was graduated from Regis High School in Manhattan. He earned his Bachelor of Arts from Boston College in 1966. Two years later, Connors received a Marshall Scholarship to study at Clare College at the University of Cambridge for a year. After a period teaching Greek and Latin at the Boston Latin School, Connors studied with Ernst Kitzinger and James S. Ackerman in the Department of Fine Arts of Harvard University (Ph.D. 1978). He has taught at the University of Chicago (1975–80); Columbia University (1980–2001), where he served as chairman of the Department of Art History and Archaeology in 1999-2001 and received the President's Award for Outstanding Teaching in 2001; and Harvard University (2011-2019).

Connors’ research centers on the architecture of seventeenth-century Rome and in particular on the genial, enigmatic figure of Francesco Borromini (1599–1667).  He has also written on town planning in Rome from the late Renaissance to the eighteenth century, pioneering a view of urban change generated around large and long-lived institutions.

Connors served as director of the American Academy in Rome in 1988-92 and of Villa I Tatti, The Harvard Center for Italian Renaissance Studies in Florence, from 2002 to 2010. To date he is the only person to have directed both of the major American research institutes in Italy.

He has held fellowships from the American Council of Learned Societies, the National Endowment for the Humanities, the Guggenheim Foundation, CASVA at the National Gallery of Art, the Bibliotheca Hertziana in Rome, All Souls College, Oxford, and the Clark Art Institute, and he was Slade Professor at Oxford in 1999. He was elected to the Accademia Nazionale di San Luca in Rome in 1993, and to the American Philosophical Society in Philadelphia in 2003. He served as president of the Renaissance Society of America in 2014-16.

In 2013, a book was written in honor of Connors' work as director of the Villa I Tatti titled Renaissance Studies in Honor of Joseph Connors, .

Personal life
Connors married Françoise Gabrielle Germaine Moison in 1969 in Gagny, France; they have two children, Geneviève (b. 1975) and Thomas (b. 1978).

Works
Borromini and the Roman Oratory: Style and Society, 1980, 
The Robie House of Frank Lloyd Wright, 1984, 
Specchio di Roma barocca: Una guida inedita del XVII secolo, 1991, 
Alleanze e inimicizie: L'urbanistica di Roma barocca, 2005, 
Piranesi and the Campus Martius: The Missing Corso, 2011, 
Bernard Berenson: Formation and Heritage, with Louis Waldman, 2014,

References

External links
 The New York Review of Books profile
 Dictionary of Art Historians profile
 Harvard University Faculty Website

1945 births
Living people
American art historians
Boston College alumni
Harvard Graduate School of Arts and Sciences alumni
Marshall Scholars
Columbia University faculty
University of Chicago faculty
Harvard University faculty
Slade Professors of Fine Art (University of Oxford)
Members of the American Philosophical Society